LeRoi Holloway Moore (September 7, 1961 – August 19, 2008) was an American saxophonist. He was a founding member of the Dave Matthews Band. Moore often arranged music for songs written by Dave Matthews. Moore also co-wrote many of the band's songs, notably "Too Much" and "Stay (Wasting Time)".

Biography

Moore was born in Durham, North Carolina to Roxie Holloway Moore and Albert P. Moore. Raised in Virginia, he attended college at James Madison University studying tenor saxophone, and later became an accomplished jazz musician in Charlottesville, Virginia, playing with artists such as John D'earth and Dawn Thompson. Moore began playing professionally after a brief stay in college. Moore helped found the Charlottesville Swing Orchestra (1982), and the John D'earth Quintet. The latter played at Miller's, a Charlottesville bar, every Thursday night in the late 1980s, where Moore first met Dave Matthews in 1991. In an effort to bring in instrumental help for some songs Matthews had written, Moore began recording songs with Matthews.

Moore played bass, baritone, tenor, alto, and soprano saxophones, as well as the flute, bass clarinet, the wooden penny whistle, and the oboe.  Moore's woodwind technician, David Saull, notes that Moore had "quite an extensive horn collection."

In addition to performing with the Dave Matthews Band, Moore recorded a 1995 album with Thompson and Greg Howard under the name Code Magenta, combining improvised jazz grooves with spoken-word poetry. He appeared on In November Sunlight, the 1996 debut album of Sokoband (then known as Soko).

Moore also worked as a producer with artist Samantha Farrell on her second album, Luminous.

Injury and death
Moore was injured on June 30, 2008, in an all-terrain vehicle accident on his farm outside Charlottesville, Virginia. His last live performance took place two days prior at the Nissan Pavilion in Bristow, Virginia.

Jeff Coffin, the saxophonist from Béla Fleck and the Flecktones, stood in for Moore on subsequent tour dates, starting July 1, 2008, in Charlotte, North Carolina. This marked the first time a band member had missed a show since 1993, two years after the band was formed.

Moore was riding an ATV on his farm to check a fence when he hit a grass-covered ditch, causing the ATV to flip and partially land on him. He broke several ribs and punctured a lung, and was hospitalized at UVA for several days. After his release, he was re-hospitalized in mid-July for complications related to the accident.

After Moore was released again from the University of Virginia Health System, he traveled to his home in Los Angeles to start his rehabilitation program. On the morning of August 19, Moore was feeling unwell and those present could see that his lips were turning blue. He was rushed to the hospital, but died shortly thereafter. While it was widely reported that he had died from a blood clot, the coroner's office determined his cause of death to be pneumonia.

The following statement was released on the band's website:We are deeply saddened to announce that LeRoi Moore, saxophonist and founding member of Dave Matthews Band, died unexpectedly Tuesday afternoon, August 19, 2008, at Hollywood Presbyterian Medical Center in Los Angeles from sudden complications stemming from his June ATV accident on his farm near Charlottesville, Virginia. LeRoi had recently returned to his Los Angeles home to begin an intensive physical rehabilitation program.

Matthews paid tribute to Moore on the day of his death at the Staples Center, Los Angeles, after the band's first song of the performance, "Bartender." "We all had some bad news today," Matthews told the sold-out crowd. "Our good friend LeRoi Moore passed on and gave his ghost up today and we will miss him forever." Fans then shouted Moore's name in remembrance.

On August 27, Moore was entombed at Holly Memorial Gardens in Albemarle County. Attendance at the funeral numbered in the thousands, including the rest of the band, Moore's family, and dedicated fans.

Moore died three months shy of his planned November 8, 2008 wedding to Lisa Beane.

Dave Matthews Band released LeRoi Moore's final concert performance as Live Trax Vol. 14. The concert took place in the band's home state of Virginia in Bristow on June 28, 2008. Proceeds from the CD were donated to local charities that Moore valued.

Tribute
On September 30, 2008, during a concert in Brazil for the South American Tour while the Dave Matthews Band was playing the introduction of "#41," Brazilian fans spread white balloons around the concert house in order to pay homage to Moore.  At this point, the band almost completely stopped playing and thanked the crowd for this amazing show of thanks to Moore. Violinist Boyd Tinsley was driven to tears by this homage to Moore.

After Moore's death, Methane Studios, the company that creates most of the band's show posters, paid tribute to Moore on the posters that were sold at the shows. One such poster that was sold at a show on September 7, 2008, which would have been Moore's 47th birthday, has become a sought after collectors item among fans. Sales of the poster have been seen as high as $600 on eBay.

A second tribute poster was printed and released on September 6, 2009, and was sold during the final day of the Gorge '09 show. The poster was the King of Spades, a part of the Royal Flush series. There were 1100 printed and all prints sold out in the first hour. It shows the King of Spades playing a saxophone with his eyes closed. Across the base of his crown it reads "GrooGrux King."

Glow sticks were also tossed by the crowd during the Gorge shows in 2008, as well as a tribute slide show video with photos of Moore, played along with the studio version of "#34" during the encore breaks.

At the 51st Grammy Awards, the first one following Moore's death, a video tribute to musicians who had died in the previous year excluded Moore, disappointing and angering fans. Neil Portnow, president of the National Academy of Recording Arts and Sciences, responded with a statement noting that Moore was included in a list of deceased musicians in the program for the event, and "unfortunately we are unable to include all of the talented and wonderful people within the allotted timeframe." This created a tremendous outrage from the band's fans and many other music celebrities.

References

External links
 
 Big Whiskey and the GrooGrux King, Rolling Stone, June 2009
 LeRoi Moore, The Influence of a Woodwind Master
 ‘Tortured,’ ’shining’ Moore remembered by Dave
 Retrospective of LeRoi Moore
 О ЛеРой Мур на русском

1961 births
2008 deaths
Deaths from pneumonia in California
African-American rock musicians
African-American woodwind musicians
Bass clarinetists
Dave Matthews Band members
James Madison University alumni
American jazz saxophonists
American male saxophonists
Musicians from Durham, North Carolina
Musicians from Charlottesville, Virginia
American rock saxophonists
20th-century American musicians
20th-century saxophonists
Jazz musicians from Virginia
Jazz musicians from North Carolina
American male jazz musicians
20th-century American male musicians